Alessandro Dell'Acqua (born 21 December 1962 in Naples) is a fashion designer. He presented his first prêt-à-porter collection at Milan Moda Donna in 1996 and his first men's line at Pitti in Florence in January 1998.

Dell'Acqua took over as creative director at Malo, the Italian luxury knit company, and showed at Milan Fashion Week for the Spring 2009 season in September.

At June 2009, Dell'Acqua sent out a press release informing the press that the men's Spring-Summer 2010 and women's Pre-spring 2010 collections will be produced without his approval, and departed ways with his eponymous label.

Currently, Dell'Acqua is back on the fashion scene with a new collection, named N°21. The name comes from the designer's birthday, and it is also his lucky number. The 80-piece collection, which spans dresses to knitwear to outerwear, will debut at the upcoming Fall 2010 Milan Fashion Week with a small runway show on February.

External links
 Official website

 FWD — Malo Confirms Alessandro Dell'Acqua
 FWD — Alessandro Dell'Acqua Without...Alessandro Dell'Acqua?

Italian fashion designers
1962 births
Living people
High fashion brands